Ferrum can refer to:

Iron, for which ferrum is the Latin term and the source of its chemical symbol Fe.
Ferrum, Virginia, United States
Ferrum College, in Ferrum, Virginia
Ferrum 49, Polish locomotive class

See also
Fer, French wine grape named after Ferrum